L'Eclisse is a 1962 Italian romance film written and directed by Michelangelo Antonioni and starring Alain Delon and Monica Vitti. Filmed on location in Rome and Verona, the story follows a young woman (Vitti) who pursues an affair with a confident young stockbroker (Delon). Antonioni attributed some of his inspiration for L'Eclisse to when he filmed a solar eclipse in Florence. The film is considered the last part of a trilogy and is preceded by L'Avventura (1960) and La Notte (1961).

L'Eclisse won the Special Jury Prize at the 1962 Cannes Film Festival and was nominated for the Palme d'Or. Described by Martin Scorsese as the boldest film in the trilogy, it is one of the director's more acclaimed works.

Plot
On a Monday of July 1961, at dawn, Vittoria, a young literary translator, ends her relationship with Riccardo in his apartment in the EUR residential district of Rome, following a long night of conversation. Riccardo tries to persuade her to stay, but she tells him she no longer loves him and leaves. As she walks the deserted early-morning streets past the EUR water tower, Riccardo catches up and walks with her through a wooded area to her apartment building, where they say their final goodbyes.

Sometime later, Vittoria visits her mother at the frantic Rome Stock Exchange, which is very busy upon Vittoria's entrance. A young stockbroker, Piero, overhears an inside tip, rushes to purchase the stocks, and then sells them at a large profit. He introduces himself to Vittoria; he is her mother's stock broker. Following the announcement of a colleague's fatal heart attack and a moment of silence, the room erupts back into frenzied activity. Outside the building, Vittoria and her mother walk to an open market nearby. Vittoria attempts to discuss her own recent breakup, but her mother is preoccupied with her earned profits.

That evening, Vittoria's neighbor Anita (Rosanna Rory) comes to visit and they discuss the former's breakup. Vittoria says she is depressed, disgusted, and confused. Another neighbor, Marta, calls and invites them to her apartment nearby. Marta talks about the farm she and her husband have in Kenya. For a game, Vittoria dresses up as an African dancer with dark makeup, and dances around the apartment. Marta, unamused, asks her to stop. The conversation turns sour as Marta, a colonialist, worries about "monkeys" arming themselves and threatening the minority whites. Vittoria and Anita dismiss such talk. When Marta's dog Zeus gets free of the house, the women run after him. Vittoria is fascinated by the sound of the fencing in the wind. Back in her apartment, Riccardo calls for her, but she hides and doesn't answer.

The next day, Vittoria and Anita fly to Verona in a small airplane. On the way, Vittoria is fascinated by the clouds. At the airport, she watches the airplanes taking off and landing with childlike wonder. "It's so nice here", she tells Anita. Meanwhile, back at the Rome Stock Exchange, Piero is busy making trades. Vittoria arrives at the Stock Exchange and learns that her mother lost about 10 million lire. Another man lost 50 million. Vittoria follows the man through the crowded streets to a small cafe, where she sees him drawing flowers on a small piece of paper and drinking mineral water. She meets Piero, and he drives her to her mother's apartment in his Alfa Romeo Giulietta sportscar. She shows him framed family pictures and her room growing up. Piero tries to kiss her, but she avoids his pass. Piero drives back to his office on Via Po near Via Salaria, where he must break the bad news to his investors.

After work outside his office, Piero meets with a call girl he previously arranged to meet, but is disappointed that she recently changed her hair color from blonde to brunette. Deciding not to go with her, Piero drives to Vittoria's apartment and stands outside her window. He hears her typing. After a drunk walks by and notices Vittoria at the window, Piero comes over. While they are talking, the drunk steals Piero's sportscar. The next morning, Piero and Vittoria arrive at the crash site where the drunk drove the car into a lake. Vittoria watches as they pull the car with the body from the water. As they walk away, Vittoria is surprised that Piero is concerned about the dents and the motor rather than the dead man. They enjoy a playful walk through a park. When they reach her building, Vittoria unties a balloon from a carriage and calling to her new friend Marta tells her to shoot the balloon with her rifle (Marta previously having shot rhinoceros and elephants in Kenya), which she does as it ascends into the sky. When they reach her building, he kisses her, but she seems uneasy. Before she leaves, she drops a piece of wood into a barrel of water.

That evening, Vittoria tries to call Piero, but his phone is busy. When she finally reaches him, she does not speak and he, thinking it's a prank call, yells into the phone and slams down the receiver. The next day, while waiting outside near her house, Vittoria looks in the barrel of water and sees the wood is still there. Piero arrives and tells her he bought a new BMW to replace his Alfa Romeo. She asks to go to his place. They walk past a nurse wheeling a young girl in a baby carriage. Piero takes her to his parents' apartment, which is filled with beautiful works of art and sculpture. As they talk, she seems nervous and unwilling to open up to him: "Two people shouldn't know each other too well if they want to fall in love. But then maybe they shouldn't fall in love at all". They converse playfully, kiss each other through a glass window, and then kiss passionately. After he accidentally tears her dress, she goes into a bedroom and looks at the old family pictures. At the window she looks down to the street where she sees two nuns walking, some people talking at a café, a lone soldier standing on a corner waiting. Piero comes to the bedroom, and they make love.

Sometime later, Piero and Vittoria are lying on a hill looking up at the sky. He looks around and says "I feel like I'm in a foreign country". She says that's how she feels around him. He gets upset when he doesn't understand what she's feeling. She says "I wish I didn't love you or that I loved you much more". Sometime later at his office, Vittoria and Piero kiss and embrace playfully on the couch, even wrestling on the floor like children. When an alarm goes off, they prepare to part. They embrace and talk of seeing each other every day. They agree to meet that evening at 8 pm at the "usual place" near her apartment. That evening, on Sunday 10 September 1961, neither shows up at the appointed meeting place.

Cast
 Alain Delon as Piero
 Monica Vitti as Vittoria
 Francisco Rabal as Riccardo
 Louis Seigner as Ercoli
 Lilla Brignone as Vittoria's Mother (Antonioni)
 Rossana Rory as Anita
 Mirella Ricciardi as Marta

Production
Filming locations
 Rome Stock Exchange, Rome, Lazio, Italy
 Rome, Lazio, Italy
 Verona, Veneto, Italy

Release
On its theatrical run in Italy, L'Eclisse grossed a total of 305 million lire. 
In France, the film had 470,764 admissions.

Reception
While Antonioni's earlier film L'Avventura had been derided upon its 1960 premiere, it was quickly reevaluated to the extent that L'Eclisse became "the most eagerly awaited film of the 1962 Cannes Film Festival"; critics had begun to believe that Antonioni's approach "was perhaps one way forward for an artform that was in danger of endlessly repeating itself". L'Eclisse won the Special Jury Prize at the festival and was nominated for the Palme d'Or (Golden Palm).

It is today considered one of Antonioni's more important works. David Sin wrote: "The intervening years appear not to have diminished its impact as an innovative work of cinema, nor as a wider critique of the age in which we live. The film retains a formal playfulness, with its open form offering different ways of watching and projecting onto the characters...and the overall atmosphere of ennui, so beautifully constructed through sound and image, still feels heavily familiar". Peter Bradshaw of The Guardian called the film "visionary" and argued "Antonioni opens up a sinkhole of existential dismay in the Roman streets and asks us to drop down into it. What a strange and brilliant film it is".

The final sequence is especially praised, with Jonathan Rosenbaum and others regarding it as one of the more effective scenes in Antonioni's oeuvre. Director Martin Scorsese, in his documentary about Italian films titled My Voyage to Italy, describes how the film haunted and inspired him as a young moviegoer, noting it seemed to him a "step forward in storytelling" and "felt less like a story and more like a poem". He adds that the ending is "a frightening way to end a film...but at the time it also felt liberating. The final seven minutes of Eclipse suggested to us that the possibilities in cinema were absolutely limitless". In the 2012 Sight & Sound polls conducted by the British Film Institute, L'Eclisse was voted in both the critics' and directors' polls as one of the 100 greatest films of all time.

Nevertheless, disapproval of the work has occasionally been voiced. Film critic Robin Wood complained that this and all films made by Antonioni after L'Avventura were "self-indulgent", "defeatist" and a "retreat into a fundamentally complacent despair". Jon Lisi of PopMatters criticized the work as "strictly intellectual" in its returns to the viewer and wrote that viewing the film "isn't exactly like watching paint dry, but the pace is so deliberately slow that it might as well be". Lisi dubbed L'Eclisse "beautifully made, historically important, and boring as hell". Conversely, Susan Doll wrote that if Antonioni's works are "out of vogue with movie goers captivated by postmodern irony and fast-paced editing...we are the worse for it. His work reflected not only a major change in Italian society but also a profound shift in film culture. His visually driven style and provocative approach to narrative raised the bar of what constituted popular filmmaking, and audiences at the time rose to the occasion to embrace it".

The film was included in BBC's 2018 list of the 100 greatest foreign language films, ranked by 209 
film critics from 43 countries.

References

Bibliography

External links
 
 
 
 Michelangelo Antonioni's L'Eclisse by David Saul Rosenfeld
 L'eclisse: A Vigilance of Desire an essay by Jonathan Rosenbaum at the Criterion Collection

Italian black-and-white films
1960s Italian-language films
1962 romantic drama films
Films directed by Michelangelo Antonioni
Trading films
Films with screenplays by Tonino Guerra
Films produced by Robert and Raymond Hakim
Films scored by Giovanni Fusco
Italian romantic drama films
1960s Italian films